Elyas is a variant of the name Elias/Elijah and may refer to:

People
Elyas Afewerki (born 1992), Eritrean cyclist 
Elyas de Daneis (fl. 13th century), English university vice-chancellor
Elyas Omar (1936–2018), third Mayor of Kuala Lumpur, Malaysia
Elyas M'Barek (born 1982), Austrian actor

Places
Elyas-e Khalifeh Hoseyn, Kermanshah Province, Iran
Elyas-e Mahmud, Kermanshah Province, Iran
Elyas, Khuzestan, Iran

See also
Elias, Greek variant of the name